Roy Warren Blackbeard (born 16 April 1953) was the High Commissioner from the Republic of Botswana to the United Kingdom until December 2018.

After working for De Beers and Price Waterhouse, as well as operating his own company, he became a Member of the National Assembly of Botswana in 1989, representing Serowe North for the Botswana Democratic Party. He was appointed the Assistant Minister for Agriculture in 1992 and the Minister in 1994, which he held until 1997; in 1998, he left Parliament and was appointed the High Commissioner in London.

References

1953 births
Botswana diplomats
Members of the National Assembly (Botswana)
Living people
Botswana people of British descent
High Commissioners of Botswana to the United Kingdom
Botswana Democratic Party politicians
Government ministers of Botswana
White Botswana people